Kottawa East Grama Niladhari Division is a Grama Niladhari Division of the Maharagama Divisional Secretariat of Colombo District of Western Province, Sri Lanka. It has Grama Niladhari Division Code 496A.

Wickramasinhapura are located within, nearby or associated with Kottawa East.

Kottawa East is a surrounded by the Hokandara East, Rukmale West, Kottawa South, Liyanagoda and Hokandara South Grama Niladhari Divisions.

Demographics

Ethnicity 

The Kottawa East Grama Niladhari Division has a Sinhalese majority (97.7%). In comparison, the Maharagama Divisional Secretariat (which contains the Kottawa East Grama Niladhari Division) has a Sinhalese majority (95.7%)

Religion 

The Kottawa East Grama Niladhari Division has a Buddhist majority (94.3%). In comparison, the Maharagama Divisional Secretariat (which contains the Kottawa East Grama Niladhari Division) has a Buddhist majority (92.0%)

References 

Grama Niladhari Divisions of Maharagama Divisional Secretariat